General elections were held in Malta between 22 and 24 July 1939. The Constitutional Party emerged as the largest party, winning 6 of the 10 seats.

Electoral system
The elections were held using the single transferable vote system, whilst suffrage was limited to men meeting certain property qualifications. The number of seats was reduced from 32 to 10.

Results

References

General elections in Malta
Malta
1939 in Malta
July 1939 events
1939 elections in the British Empire